The Mizo rain snake or narrow-headed smithophis (Smithophis atemporalis) is a species of snake found in India.

References

Smithophis
Reptiles described in 2019
Reptiles of India